Crenicichla regani is a species of cichlid native to South America. It is found in the Amazon River basin and in the Trombetas River at Cachoeira Porteira, Brazil.

The fish is named in honor of Charles Tate Regan (1878–1943), of the Natural History Museum in London, who was the last ichthyologist in 1913 to revise the genus Crenicichla before Ploeg took on the task.

References

Kullander, S.O., 2003. Cichlidae (Cichlids). p. 605-654. In R.E. Reis, S.O. Kullander and C.J. Ferraris, Jr. (eds.) Checklist of the Freshwater Fishes of South and Central America. Porto Alegre: EDIPUCRS, Brasil.

regani
Freshwater fish of Brazil
Fish of the Amazon basin
Taxa named by Alex Ploeg
Fish described in 1989